Senator Paddock may refer to:

Algernon Paddock (1830–1897), United States Senator from Nebraska from 1875 to 1881
Francis Paddock (1814–1889), Wisconsin State Senate
Ray Paddock (1877–1953), Illinois State Senate

See also
Susan Paddack (fl. 2000s–2010s), Oklahoma State Senate